is an anime original video animation co-produced by Dynamic Planning and Bandai Visual. The series is a re-imagining of the 1970s manga Getter Robo, created by Go Nagai and Ken Ishikawa, that incorporates aspects of Japanese mythology like the Oni and Abe no Seimei which replaces the Dinosaur and Hyakki Empire present in the original Getter Robo manga.

Plot 
A reimagination of the Getter Robo story, it begins with Dr. Saotome, who seeks extraordinary men to pilot his invention: The Getter Robo. Many who have tried to pilot it have died, and his son, Tatsuhito, was seriously injured during a Getter battle. He finds three men to pilot the Getter Robo: Ryoma Nagare, Hayato Jin, and Benkei Musashibo. Now they must battle and destroy the Oni, mysterious creatures that appeared suddenly which happen to resemble mythological monsters.

Characters

 : The team leader. Strong, and trained in martial arts in his father's footsteps, Ryoma is a powerful martial artist which allows him to effectively pilot the demanding Getter machine. Pilots the Eagle Machine and Getter-1.
 

 : Both a terrorist and a genius, Hayato starts out as an insane and psychopathic terrorist leader. Upon joining the Getter team, Hayato's demeanour switches to a more serious but still cold attitude, wanting to learn more about the origins of Getter energy. Pilots the Jaguar Machine and Getter-2.
 

 : A warrior monk named after the legendary Japanese hero of the same name in addition to Musashi Tomoe and Benkei Kuruma. Benkei Musashibo shares traits of both Musashi Tomoe and Benkei Kurama from the original Getter Robo, including their trademark  attack. Pilots the Bear Machine and Getter-3.
 

 : Inventor of the Getter Robo. Also pilots the Bear Machine during the second and third episodes, up until Benkei is recruited.
 

 : Professor Saotome's daughter. She is more interested in studying the Oni than fighting them. Unlike her appearances in the manga and flashbacks in Getter Robo: Armageddon, this version of Michiru is notably a lot colder and tougher.
 

 : Seimei Abe is the villain of the series. He is responsible for bringing the Oni to attack the world.

Four Heavenly Kings
The Four Heavenly Kings are revealed in episode 12 as the primary antagonists of the series that used Abe no Seimei to destroy Getter Robo.
: The "leader" of the four, attacks with lightning bolts and can grow in size.
 

: Attacks with a sword.
 

: Attacks with a large serpent on his body.
 

: Attacks with scrolls with quickly written incantations.

Episodes

References

External links
Official Bandai Visual New Getter Robo site 

2004 anime OVAs
Bandai Visual
Brain's Base
Discotek Media
Geneon USA
Getter Robo
Japanese mythology in anime and manga
Super robot anime and manga